Simuna is a small borough in Väike-Maarja Parish, Lääne-Viru County, in northeastern Estonia. It had a population of 454 as of 2011.

Before 2005 Simuna was the centre of Avanduse Parish which was merged to Väike-Maarja Parish.

One of the points of the Struve Geodetic Arc is located in Simuna.

Avanduse manor
The manor of Avanduse is located in Simuna. It was first mentioned in written records in 1494. The present-day manor building was erected in 1679–1684 by master builder Gerd Vorberg from Reval (Tallinn) who had been commissionned by the owner of the Avanduse estate at the time, Gideon von Fock. The building has been significantly rebuilt since then; most recent changes were made by architect Rudolf von Engelhardt in 1890.

Admiral and geographer Friedrich von Lütke (1797–1882) was one of the most famous owners of the estate, and a plaque dedicated to him stands on the manor building's wall.

Notable natives and residents
Friedrich von Lütke (Fyodor Litke) (1797–1882), admiral, geographer, explorer  
Carl Julius Albert Paucker (1798–1856), historian and jurist
Magnus Georg Paucker (1787–1855), astronomer
Netty Pinna (1883–1937), actress
Leo Sepp (1892–1941), politician
Vladimir Yadov (1929–2015), sociologist

Gallery

See also
 List of palaces and manor houses in Estonia

References

External links
Avanduse Manor at Estonian Manors Portal 

Boroughs and small boroughs in Estonia
Kreis Wierland